Collège Notre-Dame is a [catholic] separate high school in Sudbury, Ontario, Canada. The school is part of the Conseil scolaire de district catholique du Nouvel-Ontario and has a student population  of 631. It is one of four French Catholic high schools in the Sudbury region and is renowned for its sports teams, particularly basketball, flag football, football, gymnastics, and hockey.

History 
The school was founded in 1948 as le Pensionnat Notre-Dame-du-Bon-Conseil. Originally an all-girls school, boys were finally allowed to attend after the closure of Collège du Sacré-Cœur in the late 1980s.  Le Collège du Sacré-Cœur is now known as École secondaire du Sacré-Cœur and is the other French Catholic high school in the city of Sudbury.  Collège Notre-Dame is known for its qualities emphasizing on theoretical academics, offering Enriched Mathematics and Integrated Sciences, as well as possessing a gifted students program (Douance). The school also instils a great deal of discipline in its students, which explains why the school remains very popular among parents.

In the community 
Collège Notre-Dame is currently headed by Melanie Bourget, and is known throughout the city for its work in fundraising for the Northern Cancer Research Foundation, headed in Sudbury. In the year 2005-06 the school raised over $40,000 CDN for the foundation through such events as the blitz, where a large majority of the students went throughout the city, on assigned streets acquiring door-to-door donations. In 2010, the annual Blitz took place on May 17 and raised $20,100. In 2014, the annual Blitz took place on February 20 and raised $26,000.

Sports 
College Notre-Dame boys' hockey team captured their school's first-ever title at the Franco-Ontarien tournament, held in April 2013 in Hamilton.

Uniforms 
The students are required to wear classic uniforms, such as a navy blue cardigan or sweater vest, a red tie and grey pants for boys, and a navy blue cardigan or sweater vest and grey pants or skirt for girls, complete with a white shirt for both sexes.

See also
List of high schools in Ontario

References

External links
 

Catholic secondary schools in Ontario
High schools in Greater Sudbury
Educational institutions established in 1946
French-language high schools in Ontario
1946 establishments in Ontario